Commonwealth Conference may refer to:

Meetings of the Commonwealth of Nations in particular:
Commonwealth Prime Ministers' Conferences (1944-1969)
Commonwealth Heads of Government Meetings (since 1971)
MAC Commonwealth Conference, an intercollegiate athletic conference in the United States
Commonwealth Athletic Conference, a high school athletic conference in Massachusetts